Bruce Hurst Field is a stadium in St. George, Utah.  It is primarily used for baseball, hosting the Utah Tech University baseball team.  It was formerly the home field of the St. George Roadrunners of the Golden league.  It holds 2,500 people and was opened in 1994.  As of 2013, Bruce Hurst Field also serves as the home field for at least one BYU Cougars home series, usually during the month of February or March. It is named after Bruce Hurst, a former major league baseball player who was born in St. George.

External links
 Saint George Roadrunners - Stadium

Sports venues in Utah
Buildings and structures in St. George, Utah
College baseball venues in the United States
Utah Tech Trailblazers baseball
Minor league baseball venues
Sports venues in Washington County, Utah
Sports venues completed in 1994
1994 establishments in Utah